Medals is the second studio album by Christian singer-songerwriter Russ Taff, released in 1985 on Myrrh Records. Medals would prove to be his breakthrough album. Taff once again co-wrote with his wife Tori, along with his guitarist and songwriter James Hollihan, Jr. and contributions from other CCM artists and songwriters like Pam Mark Hall, Roby Duke and Chris Eaton.

Reception 

Thom Granger of AllMusic said the album contained "'80s pop styles and hooky songs, resulting in a CCM classic".

Accolades
Songs like "Here I Am", "Silent Love", "God Only Knows", and "I'm Not Alone" were Christian radio hits, all hitting the top ten on the Christian AC chart. Music videos were made for "I'm Not Alone" and "Not Gonna Bow" to promote the album. CCM Magazine has ranked Medals at number 36 in their 2001 book CCM Presents: The 100 Greatest Albums in Christian Music. Taff won a GMA Dove Award for Pop/Contemporary Album of the Year for Medals at the 17th GMA Dove Awards. In 1986, Taff was nominated for a Grammy Award for Best Gospel Vocal Performance, Male for Medals. The album peaked at number two on the Billboard Top Inspirational Albums chart.

GMA Dove Awards

Track listing

Personnel 
 Russ Taff – lead vocals, backing vocals (1-4, 9)
 Robbie Buchanan – synthesizers (1, 2, 3, 5-10), synth bass (1, 3, 8, 9), Fender Rhodes (2, 5, 6, 7, 10), Roland drum programming (3), rhythm arrangements (10)
 James Newton Howard – synthesizers (1, 2, 4)
 Rhett Lawrence – Fairlight CMI (9)
 Dann Huff – electric guitar, guitar solo (1, 3, 6, 9)
 Paul Jackson Jr. – electric guitar (1, 6)
 Michael Landau – electric guitar (2-5, 7-10), guitar solo (4)
 Nathan East – bass (1, 3, 6, 9, 10)
 Neil Stubenhaus – bass (2, 4, 5, 7, 8)
 Paul Leim – drums, LinnDrum programming (1, 3, 5, 6, 9), Simmons programming (1, 5)
 Lenny Castro – percussion (2-10)
 Larry Williams – saxophone (2, 4, 10)
 Bill Champlin – backing vocals (1, 2, 3, 5, 7, 8)
 Tamara Champlin – backing vocals (1, 2, 5)
 Tommy Funderburk – backing vocals
 Harry Browning – backing vocals (3)
 Carmen Twillie – backing vocals (3, 6, 9, 10)
 Tata Vega – backing vocals (3, 6, 9, 10), scat (6, 9)
 Lynn Nichols – weird backing vocal (3)

Production
 Russ Taff – producer 
 Jack Joseph Puig – producer, recording, mixing 
 Mark Ettel – assistant engineer 
 Steve Ford – assistant engineer 
 Steve MacMillan – assistant engineer 
 Todd Van Etten – assistant engineer 
 Bob Ludwig – mastering at Masterdisk (New York City, New York)
 Lynn Nichols – creative consultant 
 Stan Moser – crucial songwriting input (3)
 Jeffrey Fey – art direction, design 
 Aaron Rapoport – photography 
 Zack Glickman – direction, devotion

Charts

Year-end charts

Radio singles

References

1985 albums
Russ Taff albums
Myrrh Records albums
Word Records albums